The Men's high jump indoor world record progression starting in 1881, with additional demonstration and professional records. The best indoor performances on record as agreed to by the world's leading statisticians were accepted as the inaugural IAAF Indoor World Records from 1 January 1987. However, the inaugural record in this event was set early in 1987 by Patrick Sjoberg. Records as per the IAAF are as at 31 January 2010.

Record Progression
In lightgreen records ratified by IAAF.

Asterisks indicates cinder take-off, "A" indicates mark set at altitude

Demonstration

Professional

See also
 List of world records in athletics
 Men's high jump world record progression

References

External links
Track and Field Statistics Records Progression - World Indoor Records High Jump

High jump Indoor, men
High jump indoor, men
High jump
World record high jump indoor
Indoor track and field